Brady Alan Singer (born August 4, 1996) is an American professional baseball pitcher for the Kansas City Royals of Major League Baseball (MLB). He made his MLB debut in 2020. The Royals selected him in the first round of the 2018 MLB draft. Prior to his professional career, Singer played college baseball for the Florida Gators, and won the Dick Howser Trophy and Baseball Americas College Player of the Year Award.

Early years
Singer first attended Tavares High School in Tavares, Florida, helping the 2012 THS baseball team win its first district championship in 24 years. Singer later transferred to nearby Eustis High School in Eustis, Florida, where as a senior he went 8–3 with a 1.25 earned run average (ERA) and 110 strikeouts in 67 innings. Singer was drafted by the Toronto Blue Jays in the second round of the 2015 Major League Baseball draft, but did not sign and attended the University of Florida where he played college baseball for the Gators.

College career 
As a freshman at Florida in 2016, Singer appeared in 23 games and made one start. He finished the season 2–2 with a 4.95 ERA and 38 strikeouts in  innings. After the 2016 season, he played collegiate summer baseball for the Falmouth Commodores of the Cape Cod Baseball League, where he was named the best prospect by Baseball America. As a sophomore in 2017, Singer moved into the starting rotation. He was named to the All-SEC Second Team. He helped lead Florida to the College World Series finals against the LSU Tigers and was the starter in game 1, in which he struck out 12 batters leading the Gators to a 4–3 win. Florida eventually won the national title and Singer was named to the All-Tournament Team. In 126 total innings for the season, Singer was 9–5 with a 3.21 ERA, striking out 129 and walking 32.

In 2018, as a junior, Singer was named the SEC Pitcher of the Year after leading the SEC with ten wins while posting a 2.25 ERA. He also won the Dick Howser Trophy after owning a 12–1 record with a 2.30 ERA at the time of his selection. He finished the 2018 season with a 12–3 record and a 2.55 ERA while also compiling a .204 batting average against across 17 starts.

Professional career 
The Kansas City Royals selected Singer with the 18th overall pick in the 2018 Major League Baseball draft. On July 3, he signed with the Royals for $4.25 million.

Singer made his professional debut in 2019 with the Wilmington Blue Rocks. After going 5–2 with a 1.87 ERA over ten starts, he was promoted to the Northwest Arkansas Naturals. Singer was named to the 2019 All-Star Futures Game. Over 16 starts with the Naturals, Singer went 7–3 with a 3.47 ERA, striking out 85 over  innings.

Singer was activated onto the Royals roster at the beginning of the 2020 season and made his Major League debut on July 25, 2020, against the Cleveland Indians, and pitched five innings of two-run ball in a no-decision. He was the first pitcher from the 2018 draft class to make it to the majors and second player overall after Nico Hoerner. On September 10, 2020, he allowed no hits through 7.2 innings while playing against the Cleveland Indians until he gave up a hit to Austin Hedges in the bottom of the 8th. In his next start against the Detroit Tigers, Singer fell one pitch short of an immaculate inning, when Miguel Cabrera fouled off Singer's ninth pitch of the inning. Cabrera then struck out on the next pitch. With the 2020 Kansas City Royals, Singer appeared in 12 games, compiling a 4–5 record with 4.06 ERA and 61 strikeouts in  innings pitched. In 2021, Singer started 27 games for the Royals and went 5-10 with a 4.91 ERA, 131 strikeouts, and 53 walks over  innings. He opened the 2022 season in Kansas City's bullpen. He was optioned to the Triple-A Omaha Storm Chasers in late April.

Personal life 
For Christmas 2018, Singer surprised his parents with a special gift by paying off a loan they had from the bank along with all of their debt.

References

External links

Florida Gators bio

1996 births
Living people
People from Eustis, Florida
Baseball players from Florida
Major League Baseball pitchers
All-American college baseball players
Kansas City Royals players
Florida Gators baseball players
Falmouth Commodores players
Wilmington Blue Rocks players
Northwest Arkansas Naturals players
2023 World Baseball Classic players